The 1952 Furman Purple Hurricane football team was an American football team that represented Furman University as a member of the Southern Conference (SoCon) during the 1952 college football season. Led by third-year head coach Bill Young, the Purple Hurricane compiled an overall record of 6–3–1 with a mark of 2–2–1 in conference play, placing seventh in the SoCon.

Schedule

References

Furman
Furman Paladins football seasons
Furman Purple Hurricane football